Ancylosis convexella is a species of snout moth in the genus Ancylosis. It was described by Julius Lederer in 1855. It is found in Algeria, Jordan, Syria, Portugal, Spain, Greece and on Cyprus.

References

Moths described in 1855
convexella
Moths of Europe
Moths of Africa
Moths of Asia